is a 2012 Japanese drama film directed by Yusuke Iseya.

Cast
 Hidetoshi Nishijima as Seiji 
 Mirai Moriyama
 Nae Yūki  
 Masahiko Tsugawa

References

External links
  
 

Films directed by Yusuke Iseya
Japanese drama films
2012 drama films
2012 films
Films based on Japanese novels
2010s Japanese films

セイジ－陸の魚－